The 1981 Open Championship was a men's major golf championship and the 110th Open Championship, held from 16–19 July at Royal St George's Golf Club in Sandwich, England. Bill Rogers won his only major championship, four strokes ahead of runner-up Bernhard Langer. The Open returned to Royal St. George's for the first time since 1949, making it a new venue for all; no former champions finished in the top ten.

Past champions in the field

Made both cuts

Missed the second cut

Round summaries

First round
Thursday, 16 July 1981

Second round
Friday, 17 July 1981

Amateurs: Godwin (+6), Evans (+8), Sutton (+8), Chapman (+10), Keppler (+10), Walton (+10), Young (+10), Brand (+12), R. Mitchell (+12), Sherborne (+12), Ploujoux (+14), Thomas (+14), Blakeman (+15), Planchin (+15), Seamer (+15), Ling (+17), C. Mitchell (+18), Pook (+19), Ambridge (+20), Heib (+22), Lawrence (+23), Hall (+24), Sviland (+24).

Third round
Saturday, 18 July 1981

Amateurs: Godwin (+8), Sutton (+11), Keppler (+13), Evans (+15), Young (+15), Chapman (+16), Walton (+16).

Final round
Sunday, 19 July 1981

Amateurs: Sutton (+15), Godwin (+19)Source:

References

External links
Royal St George's 1981 (Official site)
110th Open Championship - Royal St George's (European Tour)
(GolfCompendium.com)

The Open Championship
Golf tournaments in England
Open Championship
Open Championship
Open Championship